Partial general elections were held in Belgium on 10 June 1890. In the elections for the Chamber of Representatives the result was a victory for the Catholic Party, which won 94 of the 138 seats.

Under the alternating system, elections were held in only four out of the nine provinces: Hainaut, Limburg, Liège and East Flanders. Thus, only 69 seats out of the 138 were up for election. Additionally, a special election was held in Neufchâteau on 3 June 1890.

Results

Chamber of Representatives

Constituencies
The distribution of seats among the electoral districts was as follows:

References

1890s elections in Belgium
General
Belgium
Belgium